Time Spiral is a block of card expansions for the trading card game Magic: The Gathering.

Time Spiral may also refer to:

La Spirale du temps (English: The Time Spiral), eleventh book of Yoko Tsuno comic book series
Time Spiral, short story by Sergey Lukyanenko as part of the Nuclear Dream story collection

See also
Live in an American Time Spiral, a 1982 album by George Russell